Jhook is a village in Mahendragarh Tehsil in Mahendragarh District of Haryana State, India. It belongs to Gurgaon Division. It is near to Rewari-Kanina- Mahendergarh road on approach road.

References 

Villages in Mahendragarh district